Reily can refer to:
 Emmet Montgomery Reily, an American politician

Reily family
 John Reily, a soldier in the American Revolution
 Robert Reily, son of John Reily, and a Union Colonel in the American Civil War
 Reily Township, Butler County, Ohio, named after John Reily

See also

 Riley (disambiguation)
 Reilly (disambiguation)
 O'Reilly